The Benvenuti Situla  is a bronze situla that dates to ca. 600 B.C. It is a product of the situla art that spread north from the Etruscans in this period, in this case to the Este culture that flourished in Este, Veneto during the 7th century BC. The vessel is now conserved in the local National Museum Atestino. The relief work on the vessel depicts scenes of aristocratic life. These include banqueting as well as scenes of military victory. The iconography of the relief scenes of the situla may indicate Etruscan influence.

See also
Adriatic Veneti
Polada culture
Euganei
Canegrate culture
Golasecca culture
Prehistoric Italy

External links
La Situla Benvenuti

References

7th-century BC works
Archaeology of Italy
Bronzeware
Este culture

Luca Zaghetto La situla Benvenuti di Este. Il poema figurato degli Antichi Veneti, Bologna 2017.